

Edgar (or Eadgar) was a medieval Bishop of Lindsey.

Edgar was consecrated possibly in 693. He died between 716 and 731.

Citations

References

External links
 

Bishops of Lindsey